The 13th Australian Recording Industry Association Music Awards (generally known as the ARIA Music Awards or simply The ARIAS) was held on 12 October 1999 at the Sydney Entertainment Centre. Hosted by Paul McDermott and Bob Downe, and presenters, including Melanie C of the Spice Girls, Tina Cousins, Fiona Horne and Molly Meldrum, distributed 33 awards. The big winner for the year was Powderfinger with four awards.

Two new categories, Best Original Cast / Show Recording and Best Blues and Roots Album were created; while Song of the Year (Songwriter), Best Indigenous Release and Best New Talent categories were retired. In addition to the annually presented awards, a Special Achievement Award was received by both recording studio owner Bill Armstrong (see Armstrong Studios) and Fable Record's creator Ron Tudor. An Outstanding Achievement Award was received by Natalie Imbruglia. The ARIA Hall of Fame inducted: Jimmy Little and Richard Clapton.

Ceremony details

The ceremony was hosted by TV comedians, Paul McDermott and Bob Downe, and 33 awards were presented by Melanie C of the Spice Girls, Tina Cousins, Fiona Horne, former Countdown host Molly Meldrum and others.

Presenters and performers 

Presenters and performers were:

Awards

Final nominees for awards are shown in plain, with winners in bold.

ARIA Awards

Album of the Year 
Powderfinger – Internationalist
Ben Lee – Breathing Tornados
The Living End – The Living End
Silverchair – Neon Ballroom
Spiderbait – Grand Slam
Single of the Year 
Powderfinger – "The Day You Come"
Josh Abrahams – "Addicted to Bass"
Ben Lee – "Cigarettes Will Kill You"
Regurgitator – "! (The Song Formerly Known As)"
Silverchair – "Ana's Song (Open Fire)"
Highest Selling Album 
John Farnham, Olivia Newton-John, Anthony Warlow – Highlights from The Main Event
Cold Chisel – The Last Wave of Summer
Natalie Imbruglia – Left of the Middle
Regurgitator – Unit
The Living End – The Living End

Highest Selling Single 
Joanne / BZ – "Jackie"
Bachelor Girl – "Buses and Trains"
Human Nature – "Last to Know"
Savage Garden – "The Animal Song"
Silverchair – "Anthem for the Year 2000"

Best Group
The Living End – The Living End
Powderfinger – Internationalist
Regurgitator – "! (The Song Formerly Known As)"
Silverchair – Neon Ballroom
You Am I – "Heavy Heart"
Best Female Artist 
Natalie Imbruglia – "Wishing I Was There"
Kasey Chambers – The Captain
Suze DeMarchi – Telelove
Lisa Miller – As Far as a Life Goes
Kylie Minogue – "Cowboy Style"
Best Male Artist
Tim Rogers – What Rhymes with Cars and Girls
Josh Abrahams – Sweet Distorted Holiday
Ben Lee – Breathing Tornados
Alex Lloyd – "Lucky Star"
Paul Kelly – "I'll Be Your Lover"
Breakthrough Artist – Album
The Living End – The Living End
Bachelor Girl – Waiting for the Day
Gerling – Children of Telepathic Experiences
Not from There – Sand on Seven
Marie Wilson – Real Life
Breakthrough Artist – Single
Alex Lloyd – "Lucky Star"
Taxiride – "Get Set"
Frenzal Rhomb – "You Are Not My Friend"
Gerling – "Enter, Space Capsule"
Not from There – "Sich Offnen"
Best Dance Release
Josh Abrahams – Sweet Distorted Holiday
B(if)tek – "Bedrock"
Fatt Dex – Jus' Funkin
Honeysmack – Walk on Acid
Sonic Animation – "Love Lies Bleeding"
Best Pop Release 
Savage Garden – "The Animal Song"
Bachelor Girl – Waiting for the Day
Deadstar – "Run Baby Run"
Human Nature – Counting Down
Taxiride – "Get Set"
Best Rock Album 
Powderfinger – Internationalist
Cold Chisel – The Last Wave
Frenzal Rhomb – A Man's Not a Camel
Henry's Anger – Personality Test
Silverchair – Neon Ballroom
Best Country Album
Kasey Chambers – The Captain
Adam Brand – Adam Brand
Tania Kernaghan – Dancing on Water
Kedron Taylor – Every Place I Go
Various – Not So Dusty
Best Blues & Roots Album 
David Hole – Under the Spell
The Backsliders – Poverty Deluxe
Jeff Lang – Cedar Grove
Kerri Simpson – Confessin' the Blues
Weddings Parties Anything – They Were Better Live
Best Independent Release 
Josh Abrahams – Sweet Distorted Holiday
Crawlspace – "Away"
Diana Ah Naid – "Oh No (Curbside Lullaby)"
Pauline Pantsdown – "I Don't Like It"
Pre-Shrunk – "Triple A Side"
Best Alternative Release 
Not from There – Sand on Seven
Gerling – Children of Telepathic Experiences
Tim Rogers – What Rhymes with Cars and Girls
Something for Kate – Beautiful Sharks
Spiderbait – Grand Slam
Tendrils – Soaking Red
Best Adult Contemporary Album 
Jimmy Little – Messenger
Frank Bennett – Cash Landing
The Black Sorrows – Beat Club
John Farnham, Olivia Newton-John, Anthony Warlow – Highlights from The Main Event
Renée Geyer – Sweet Life
Best Comedy Release 
Martin/Molloy – Eat Your Peas
Judith Lucy – King of the Road
Merrick and Rosso – Teenage Mullet Fury
Pauline Pantsdown – "I Don't Like It"
Rodney Rude – More Grunt

Fine Arts Awards
Best Jazz Album 
Andrew Speight Quartet – Andrew Speight Quartet
Browne Haywood Stevens – Sudden in a Shaft of Sunlight
Jamie Oehlers – Strut
Janet Seidel – The Way You Wear Your Hat
Scott Tinkler Trio – Sofa King
Best Classical Album 
Gerard Willems – Piano: Beethoven Sonatas Volume 1
Tamara Anna Cislowska – Piano: The Russian Album
Paul Dean (clarinet) Queensland Symphony Orchestra, Richard Mills – Ariel's Music
Melbourne Symphony Orchestra, Vernon Handley – The Eternal Rhythm
Sara Macliver (soprano), Australian Brandenburg Orchestra, Paul Dyer – If Love's a Sweet Passion
Best Children's Album 
The Hooley Dooleys – Pop
Australian Girls Choir & National Boys Choir – Australian Christmas Spirit
Cubbyhouse – Rock Cake
Franciscus Henri – Hooray for Mr Whiskers
Monica Trapaga – Monica's Trip to the Moon
Best Original Cast / Show Recording 
Judi Connelli & Suzanne Johnston – Perfect Strangers
Bananas in Pyjamas – It's Show Time!
Opera Australia, Christine Douglas & Suzanne Johnston – Hansel & Gretel
State Orchestra of Victoria – Rudolf Nureyev's Don Quixote
Best Original Soundtrack Recording 
David Hirschfelder – Elizabeth
Felicity Fox – Afrika – Cape Town to Cairo
David Hirschfelder – The Interview
Various – Praise
Various – Two Hands
Best World Music Album 
The Habibis – Intoxication
Lajamanu Teenage Band – Vision
Sirocco – Falling Leaf
Voices from the Vacant Lot – Dance on Your Bones
Xylouris Ensemble – Drakos

Artisan Awards
Producer of the Year
Bachelor Girl – Bachelor Girl – Waiting for the Day
Paul Begaud – Felicity – We'll Never Get Along; – Human Nature – "Now that I've Found You", "Depend on Me", "Last to Know", "Be There with You"
Nick Launay – Primary – "Supposed to Be Here", "24000", "This Is the Sound", "Come to Take You Home"; – Silverchair – Neon Ballroom
Magoo – Automatic – "Pump it Up"; – Custard – "Loverama"; – Not from There – Sand on Seven
Phil McKellar – Spiderbait – Grand Slam
Engineer of the Year 
Nick Launay – Primary – "Supposed to Be Here", "24000", "This Is the Sound", "Come to Take You Home"; – Silverchair – Neon Ballroom
Josh Abrahams – Josh Abrahams – Sweet, Distorted Holiday
Magoo – Automatic – "Pump it Up"; – Midnight Oil – Redneck Wonderland
Phil McKellar – Spiderbait – Grand Slam
Kalju Tonuma – 28 Days – Kid Indestructible; – Felicity Hunter – "Hardcore Adore"; – The Mavis's – "Puberty Song"
Best Video 
Andrew Lancaster, David McCormick – Custard – "Girls Like That..."
Cate Anderson – Silverchair – "Ana's Song (Open Fire)"
Andrew Dominik – The Cruel Sea – "You'll Do"
Craig Melville, David Curry – Josh Abrahams – "Addicted to Bass"
Tony McGrath – Regurgitator – "! (The Song Formerly Known As)"
Best Cover Art 
Kevin Wilkins – Powderfinger – Internationalist
Janet English, George Stajsic – Spiderbait – Grand Slam
Reg Mombassa – Mental As Anything – Garage
John Watson, Kevin Wilkins, Melissa Chenery – Silverchair – Neon Ballroom
Quan Yeomans, Janet English – Happyland – Welcome to Happyland

Achievement awards

Outstanding Achievement Award

Natalie Imbruglia: recognises her international chart and sales success of her single, "Torn" (October 1997) and the related album, Left of the Middle (November 1997).

Special Achievement Award

 Bill Armstrong: received for the establishment of his Armstrong Studios, which provided "[the] introduction of Multi Track Recording in Australia... the first 8-track recorded into Australia, then 16- and 24-track machines together with State of the Art mixing desks."
 Ron Tudor: "[his] involvement in the development of the Australian Recording Industry is well recognised throughout Australia and overseas... his greatest moments have been in witnessing the growth and success of our industry and many of Australia's very first recording artists climb their way to recognition at home and overseas."

ARIA Hall of Fame inductees
The Hall of Fame inductees were:
Richard Clapton inducted by INXS member, Andrew Farriss. When previewing his induction, Clapton observed, "That's very apt. Especially since I wrote a really good song with Andrew a few months ago."
Jimmy Little

References

External links
ARIA Awards official website
List of 1999 winners

1999 music awards
1999 in Australian music
ARIA Music Awards